Concepción "Concha" Andreu Rodríguez (born 10 March 1967) is a Spanish oenologist and politician who currently serves as the President of La Rioja. Since 2011 she has been a member of the Parliament of La Rioja.

Biography
Andreu was born in 1967 in Calahorra. She studied biological sciences at the University of Salamanca and obtained a master's degree in viticulture and oenology from the University of Zaragoza.

She obtained a seat at the Parliament of La Rioja in 2011. In the 2015 Riojan regional election, Andreu was the candidate of the Spanish Socialist Workers' Party (PSOE) for President of La Rioja, and PSOE obtained 10 seats out of 33, while the People's Party (PP) obtained 15. Andreu was subsequently the parliament spokesperson for PSOE.

In the 2019 Riojan regional election, Andreu repeated as PSOE's candidate for President of La Rioja. PSOE obtained 15 seats out of 33, becoming the largest party in the Parliament of La Rioja for the first time since the 1991 election. On 27 August, Andreu was invested president after reaching an agreement with Podemos and United Left. Andreu is the first woman to hold the office of President of La Rioja.

References

1967 births
Presidents of La Rioja (Spain)
Politicians from La Rioja
Spanish Socialist Workers' Party politicians
Living people
Members of the 8th Parliament of La Rioja (Spain)
Members of the 9th Parliament of La Rioja (Spain)
Members of the 10th Parliament of La Rioja (Spain)
People from Calahorra